The Ce 6/6  was an electric locomotive operated by Schweizerischen Bundesbahnen (Swiss Federal Railways) (SBB). Originally ordered from Siemens-Schuckert by Malmbanen in Sweden as Fc 2x3 / 3 in 1912, the locomotive was not delivered due to World War I and was instead bought by SBB in 1919.

Description
The sole Ce 6/6 was a double locomotive consisting of two identical halves permanently connected. Each engine had a drivers cab, with a large electric motor mounted behind driving three axles. Originally allocated the service number 12200, it was renumbered 14101 in 1920.

Service
The locomotive was used to pull good trains between Bern and Thun. It was retired early in 1937 due to the high maintenance costs inherent in running a unique engine.

Röthenbachsäge
The Ce 6/6 was known as Röthenbachsäge, named after the sawmill near Röthenbach im Emmental, due to the mechanical sawing sound of its low speed engine.

References 
 

Electric locomotives of Switzerland
Ce 6 6
15 kV AC locomotives
Standard gauge locomotives of Switzerland
Railway locomotives introduced in 1919